Tree: Live Tour 2014 (stylized as Tohoshinki Live Tour 2014 ～TREE～), also known as the Tree Tour, was the seventh Japanese concert tour (eleventh overall) by South Korean pop duo Tohoshinki, and was launched in support of their seventh Japanese studio album Tree (2014). It was first announced by the duo in November 2013, during the last show of their fanclub event tour, The Mission II. The theme of the tour was the Tree of Life, in which Tohoshinki, two beings born from the tree of life, use their spirit to save humanity from darkness.

The Tree Tour kicked off in Yokohama on April 22, 2014 and visited a total of ten cities and eleven venues in Japan. It concluded on June 22, 2014 in Osaka. Over 600,000 people attended the tour.

Background
On November 23, 2013, Tohoshinki held their fanclub event tour The Mission II at the Saitama Super Arena, where they performed several songs from their last two albums and interacted with fans. At the end of the show, Tohoshinki revealed their plans to embark on a new nationwide tour in 2014. Following the duo's unveil, twenty-six dates for their tour were announced by their record label Avex Trax, but the name of the tour was not officially revealed until January 2014, when Tohoshinki announced the release of their seventh Japanese album, Tree.

Unlike the duo's previous Time: Live Tour 2013, which visited all five of Japan's major concert domes including the Nissan Stadium, the Tree Tour visited smaller concert halls and arenas. The duo stated that they wanted to perform in smaller venues in order to have better interactions with their audience. The Tree Tour began with three shows in the Yokohama Arena in April 2014.

On February 24, 2014, three additional dates were announced, extending the tour's shows at Tokyo Dome and Osaka Dome to four days each, making Tohoshinki the first non-Japanese band to hold concerts at the Tokyo Dome for three years in a row. On March 20, the tour's official website and merchandise were launched.

Setlist
This setlist is representative of the first show in Yokohama. It does not represent all dates throughout the tour.
"Champion"
"SCREAM"
"Disvelocity"
"Cheering"

"Breeding Poison"

"B.U.T (BE-AU-TY)"
"I love you"

"Wedding Dress"
"Hide & Seek"
"Crazy Crazy Crazy"
"Good Days"
"Over" (Changmin solo)
"Shout Out!" (Yunho solo)
"Spellbound" (Japanese version)
"Something" (Japanese version)
"Why? (Keep Your Head Down)" (Japanese version)
"Easy Mind"
"Humanoids" (Japanese version)
"TREE OF LIFE"
Encore
 "miss you"
 "Sweat"
 "OCEAN" / "Somebody to Love"
 "Good-bye for Now"

Tour dates

DVD

Tohoshinki Live Tour 2014 ～TREE～ is a live DVD concert film by South Korean pop duo Tohoshinki, released on August 27, 2014 in Japan. The DVD was filmed during the duo's seventh Japan-wide concert tour Tree, which ran from April to June 2014. The tour stopped by ten cities and visited eleven different venues in Japan, including the Tokyo Dome and Kyocera Dome Osaka, rounding up to a total of 29 shows.

History
The DVD documents the live performances during the tour's four-day stop at the Tokyo Dome, between May 20 and 24, 2014. It was released in three separate editions; a 2-DVD standard edition, a 3-DVD limited edition, and a Blu-ray. The limited edition also includes a third DVD, which features backstage interviews, behind-the-scene footage, a tour documentary, an MC digest segment, and an additional photobook pamphlet.

Track listing

Chart performance
Live Tour 2014: Tree debuted at number one on the Oricon DVD Chart, selling 104,000 copies on the first week of release. It was Tohoshinki's fifth DVD release to debut at number-one in Japan. The Blu-ray edition also debuted at number one on the Oricon Blu-ray Chart, selling 18,000 copies on the first week.

The following week, both the DVD and the Blu-ray fell to number three. The DVD stayed charted in the top ten for four consecutive weeks. It ultimately charted for 13 weeks and sold 116,000 units in Japan, becoming the eleventh best-selling DVD of the year. The Blu-ray edition stayed charted for six weeks, selling 20,000 copies.

Charts

Weekly charts

Year-end charts

Sales

Release history

Personnel
Credits are taken from the DVD's liner notes.

Main
Executive producer 
Lee Soo-man (S.M. Entertainment)
Max Matsuura (Avex Group)
General producer
Nam So-young (S.M. Entertainment Japan)
Ryuhei Chiba (Avex Group)
Total stage producer – Sam
Tour advisor – Katsumi Kuroiwa
Tour producer – Yoko Kikuta
Tour director – Masato Yoshikiawa
Tour contents producer – Toshiro Hayashi
Tour contents director – Nobuto Kkura, Naoko Kojima
Technical director – Naoto Hori, Hidetomo Suzuki
Visual director – Kenta Sekine
Shooting crew director – Hiroko Ishizuchi
Director of photography – Koji Matsuura
Choreographer – Shige, Achi, Taichi
Stylist – Yosuke Sasagawa

Band and performers
Dancers – Sonny, 50, Ywki, Achi, Tamiya, k-sk, Yoshiki, Ryota, Hiroto, Rui, Rika, Lina
Band master and keyboards – Yoichiro Kakizaki
Drums – Tetsuya Hatamo
Bass – Watru Suzuki
Guitar – Kiyoto Konda
Percussion – Masao Fukunaga

References

External links
 Tree Concert Official Website 

2014 concert tours
TVXQ concert tours